Danger Zone is American hard rock band Hardline's fourth studio album, and their first since Leaving the End Open. Johnny Gioeli is the sole returning member from the Leaving the End Open lineup, and is joined by keyboardist and producer Alessandro Del Vecchio, guitarist Thorsten Koehne, bassist Anna Portalupi, and drummer Francesco Jovino. Danger Zone was released in Europe on May 18, 2012, and in America on May 22, both through Frontiers Records.

Unlike previous Hardline albums, Johnny Gioeli did not initiate the project, nor was he the primary songwriter. The project came to fruition when Alessandro Del Vecchio, a longtime fan of Hardline, of Eden's Curse and Edge of Forever wrote and composed songs with Gioeli's vocals specifically in mind, then proceeded to record demos to send to Frontiers Records president Serafino Perugino. Perugino, after listening to and approving the demos, sent them to Gioeli, who immediately became interested in reforming Hardline and recording the songs for a new album. Gioeli and Del Vecchio were joined by Thorsten Koehne, also of Eden's Curse, Anna Portalupi of Lionville, and Francesco Jovino, also of Edge of Forever.

Gioeli has noted that he plans for Hardline to be significantly more active than it has been since its revival in 2001, and that he and Del Vecchio began writing for a follow-up album during the summer and making plans for a tour to initiate during the winter of 2012. This marks the first time in the band's history that a second album will closely follow a release, as well as the band's first tour since 1992, and first live performances since Live at the Gods Festival 2002. Until further touring plans come to fruition, Hardline's only scheduled live performances are the Sweden Rock Festival on June 7, 2013, and the 2013 "FireFest" Melodic Rock Festival in Nottingham, UK from October 18–20. Axel Rudi Pell drummer Mike Terrana and returning Hardline guitarist Josh Ramos perform in place of Thorsten Koehne and Francesco Jovino.

Track listing

Personnel
Johnny Gioeli - lead vocals
Alessandro Del Vecchio - keyboards, backing vocals
Thorsten Koehne - guitars
Anna Portalupi - bass
Francesco Jovino - drums

References

Hardline (band) albums
2012 albums
Frontiers Records albums